Hitrino Ridge (‘Rid Hitrino’ \'rid 'hi-tri-no\) is the rocky ridge extending 3.5 km in northwest-southeast direction and 2.8 km in northeast-southwest direction, rising to 805 m between two southeastwards flowing tributaries to Flask Glacier in Aristotle Mountains on Oscar II Coast in Graham Land.  The feature is named after the settlement of Hitrino in Northeastern Bulgaria.

Location
British mapping in 1976.

Maps
 British Antarctic Territory.  Scale 1:200000 topographic map.  DOS 610 Series, Sheet W 65 62.  Directorate of Overseas Surveys, Tolworth, UK, 1976.
 Antarctic Digital Database (ADD). Scale 1:250000 topographic map of Antarctica. Scientific Committee on Antarctic Research (SCAR). Since 1993, regularly upgraded and updated.

Notes

References
 Hitrino Ridge. SCAR Composite Antarctic Gazetteer.
 Bulgarian Antarctic Gazetteer. Antarctic Place-names Commission. (details in Bulgarian, basic data in English)

External links
 Hitrino Ridge. Copernix satellite image

Ridges of Graham Land
Oscar II Coast
Bulgaria and the Antarctic